Memorial Best: Gift of Melodies is the third and the last greatest hits album by Japanese pop-rock band Field of View. It was released on 9 October 2002 on Zain Records, on the same day as their music video compilation "View Clips -Memorial Best-". The album includes all of their released singles in addition to some unreleased songs. The "view" singles are not included. The album reached #19 in its first week and sold 12,000 copies. The album charted for 2 weeks and sold more than 16,000 copies. After the album's release and their last live performance, Field of View disbanded.

Track listing

Disc 1

Disc 2

Cover versions
Miho Komatsu covered Oozora he on her 6th album, Hanano and Kono Machi de Kimi to Kurashitai on her debut album, Nazo. Zard covered Last Good-bye on their last studio album, and Kimi to no Distance, Kimi ga Ita kara, Totsuzen and Dan Dan Kokoro Hikareteku on their 7th studio album, Today Is Another Day.

Usage in media
Kimi ga Ita Kara was used as the theme song for the Fuji TV drama "Kagayaku Kisetsu no Naka de".
Totsuzen was used in a commercial for Pocari Sweat.
Last Good-bye was used as the ending theme for the Tokyo Broadcasting System Television drama "Discovery of the World's Mysteries".
Dan Dan Kokoro Hikareteku was used as the opening theme for the anime series Dragon Ball GT.
Doki was used in a commercial for All Nippon Airways as part of their "ANA's Paradise" promotion.
Dreams was used as the theme song for the Nihon TV program "Natural Ai no Yukue".
Kono Machi de Kimi to Kurashitai was used as the ending theme for the TV Asahi program "Chou Jigen Time Bomber".
Kawaita Sakebi was used as the opening theme for the 1998 anime adaptation of Yu-Gi-Oh!.
Meguru Kisetsu wo Koete was used as the ending theme for the Fuji TV program Unbelievable.
Kimi wo Terasu Taiyou Ni was used as the ending theme for the Tokyo Broadcasting System Television program "Uwasa no! Tokyo Magazine".
Aoi Kasa de was used as the ending theme for the Tokyo Broadcasting System Television program Kinniku Banzuke.
Still was used as the ending theme for the Tokyo Broadcasting System Television program "Wonderful".
Fuyu no Ballad was used as the ending theme for the Tokyo Broadcasting System Television program "Kokoro no Tobira".
Beautiful day was used as the opening theme for the Yomiuri Telecasting Corporation program "Shuffle".
Akikaze Monochrome was used as the ending theme for the Nihon TV program  "Manekin"
Melody was used as the ending theme for the Tokyo Broadcasting System Television program "COUNT DOWN TV Neo".

References

Being Inc. compilation albums
2002 compilation albums
Japanese-language compilation albums
Field of View albums